The MYH16 gene encodes a protein called myosin heavy chain 16, which is a muscle protein in mammals. At least in primates, it is a specialized muscle protein found only in the temporalis and masseter muscles of the jaw. Myosin heavy chain proteins are important in muscle contraction, and if they are missing, the muscles will be smaller. In non-human primates, MYH16 is functional and the animals have powerful jaw muscles. In humans, the MYH16 gene has a mutation that causes the protein not to function. Although the exact importance of this change in accounting for differences between humans and other apes is not yet clear, such a change may be related to increased brain size and finer control of the jaw, which facilitates speech. It is not clear how the MYH16 mutation relates to other changes to the jaw and skull in early human evolution (for example, whether the MYH16 mutation happened first and led to other changes, or whether the MYH16 mutation happened after other changes made the MYH16 protein no longer necessary).

The initial discovery of the human MYH16 mutation was published in 2004 by a team at the University of Pennsylvania led by Hansell H. Stedman. The date of the mutation has variously been estimated at about 2.4 million years ago or 5.3 million years ago.

The MYH16 gene is present in dogs, but does not appear to be present in mice.

References

External links 
 Story from Science Scoop
 
 

Mammal genes